This is a list of mythological places which appear in mythological tales, folklore, and varying religious texts.

Egyptian mythology

Greek mythology

Norse mythology

Indian / Hindu mythology

East Asian mythology

Abrahamic mythology

Celtic mythologies

Others

References

Works cited

Mythological places
Places